Laiveliai (formerly) is a village in Kėdainiai district municipality, in Kaunas County, in central Lithuania. According to the 2011 census, the village was uninhabited.

History 
Till 1863 it was owned by the Ignacgorodas estate (a property of the Geištarai family).

Demography

References

Villages in Kaunas County
Kėdainiai District Municipality